Tenodera is a genus of mantis in the family Mantidae which contains several species of praying mantises.  The species in this genus can be found primarily in Africa, Asia and Australia, but also North America.

Description
Specifically, mantids in this genus can be identified by their mid and hind femora which contain an apical spine.

Species
The following species are recognised in the genus Tenodera:
Tenodera acuticauda (Yang, 1997)
Tenodera angustipennis (Saussure, 1869) (narrow-winged mantis)
Tenodera aridifolia (Stoll, 1813)
Tenodera australasiae (Leach, 1814) (purple-winged mantis)
Tenodera caudafissilis (Wang, 1992)
Tenodera chloreudeta (Burmeister, 1838)
Tenodera costalis (Blanchard, 1853)
Tenodera fasciata (Olivier, 1792)
Tenodera intermedia (Saussure, 1870)
Tenodera iringana (Giglio-Tos, 1912)
Tenodera parasinensis (Otte & Spearman, 2004)
Tenodera philippina (Beier, 1929)
Tenodera rungsi (Uvarov, 1935)
Tenodera sinensis (Saussure, 1871) (Chinese mantis)
Tenodera stotzneri (Werner, 1929)
Tenodera superstitiosa (Fabricius, 1781)

See also
List of mantis genera and species#Genus Tenodera

References

External links
A key to Mantidae classification
Tree of Life - Tenodera

Mantidae
Mantodea genera
Taxa named by Hermann Burmeister